Wolf Patrol is a wildlife conservation organization seeking to protect the grey wolves of the contiguous United States.

References

External links 

 

Wolf organizations
Organizations based in the United States